This is a list of current and former notable shopping malls and shopping centers in the United States of America.

Alabama 

 Auburn Mall – Auburn (1973–present)
 Bridge Street Town Centre – Huntsville (2007–present)
 Brookwood Village – Birmingham (1973–present)
 Century Plaza – Birmingham (1975–2009)
 Decatur Mall – Decatur (1978–present)
 Eastdale Mall – Montgomery (1977–present)
 Eastern Shore Centre – Spanish Fort (2004–present)
 Eastwood Mall – Birmingham (1960–2006)
 Florence Mall – Florence (1978–present)
 Gadsden Mall – Gadsden (1974–present)
 Heart of Huntsville Mall – Huntsville (1961–2007)
 High Point Town Center – Prattville (2008–present)
 Jasper Mall – Jasper (1981–present)
 Madison Square Mall – Huntsville (1984–2017)
 The Mall at Westlake – Bessemer (1969–2009)
 McFarland Mall – Tuscaloosa (1969–2016)
 Montgomery Mall – Montgomery (1970–2008)
 Parkway Place – Huntsville (2002–present)
 Pelican Place at Craft Farms – Gulf Shores (2008–present)
 Pinnacle at Tutwiler Farm – Trussville (2006–present)
 Quintard Mall – Oxford (1970–present)
 Riverchase Galleria – Hoover (1986–present)
 Selma Mall – Selma (1971–present)
 The Shoppes at Bel Air – Mobile (1967–present)
 The Shoppes at Eastchase – Montgomery (2002–present)
 Southgate Mall – Muscle Shoals (1968–present)
 Springdale Mall – Mobile (1959–present)
 The Summit – Birmingham (1997–present)
 University Mall – Tuscaloosa (1980–present)
 Western Hills Mall – Fairfield (1969–present)
 Wiregrass Commons Mall – Dothan (1986–present)

Alaska 
 Anchorage 5th Avenue Mall – Anchorage (1987–present)
 Bentley Mall – Fairbanks (1977–present)
 Dimond Center – Anchorage (1977–present)

Arizona 

 Arizona Mills – Tempe (1997–present)
 Arrowhead Towne Center – Glendale (1993–present)
 Biltmore Fashion Park – Phoenix (1963–present)
 Chandler Fashion Center – Chandler (2001–present)
 Christown Spectrum Mall – Phoenix (1961–present)
 Desert Ridge Marketplace – Phoenix (2001–present)
 Desert Sky Mall – Phoenix (1981–present)
 El Con Center – Tucson (1960–present)
 Estrella Falls – Goodyear (2016–present)
 Fiesta Mall – Mesa (1979–2018)
 Flagstaff Mall – Flagstaff (1979–present)
 Foothills Mall – Tucson (1982–present)
 Kierland Commons – Phoenix (2000–present)
 La Encantada – Tucson (2003–present)
 Los Arcos Mall – Scottsdale (1969–1999)
 The Mall at Sierra Vista – Sierra Vista (1999–present)
 Mesa Riverview – Mesa (2007–present)
 Metrocenter – Phoenix (1973–2020)
 Paradise Valley Mall – Phoenix (1978–2021)
 Park Place – Tucson (1975–present)
 Prescott Gateway Mall – Prescott (2002–present)
 SanTan Village – Gilbert (2007–present)
 Scottsdale Fashion Square – Scottsdale (1961–present)
 Superstition Springs Center – Mesa (1990–present)
 Tanger Factory Outlet Centers – Glendale (1981–present)
 Tempe Marketplace – Tempe (2007–present)
 Tri-City Pavilions – Mesa (1968–1998)
 Tucson Mall – Tucson (1982–present)

Arkansas 

 Central Mall – Fort Smith (1971–present)
 Indian Mall – Jonesboro (1968–2008) (demolished except Sears, which closed in 2017)
 The Mall at Turtle Creek – Jonesboro (2006–present)
 McCain Mall – North Little Rock (1973–present)
 Northwest Arkansas Mall – Fayetteville (1972–present)
 Park Plaza Mall – Little Rock (1960–present)
 Pavilion in the Park – Little Rock (1985–present)
 Pinnacle Hills Promenade – Rogers (2006–present)
 University Mall – Little Rock (1967–2007)

California 

 2nd & PCH - Long Beach (2019–present)
 Americana at Brand – Glendale (2008–present)
 Anaheim GardenWalk – Anaheim (2008–present)
 Anaheim Plaza – Anaheim (1994–present)
 Antelope Valley Mall – Palmdale (1990–present)
 Arden Fair – Sacramento (1957–present)
 Baldwin Hills Crenshaw Plaza – Los Angeles (1947–present)
 Barstow Mall – Barstow, California (1975–present)
 Bay Street Emeryville – Emeryville (2002–present)
 Bayfair Center – San Leandro (1957–present)
 Bayshore Mall – Eureka (1987–present)
 Bella Terra – Huntington Beach (2006–present)
 Beverly Center – Los Angeles (1982–present)
 Beverly Connection – Beverly Grove, Los Angeles (1989–present)
 Brea Mall – Brea (1977–present)
 Broadway Plaza – Walnut Creek (1951–present)
 Buena Park Downtown – Buena Park (1961–present)
 Burbank Town Center – Burbank (1991–present)
 Capitola Mall – Capitola (1977–present)
 Carousel Mall – San Bernardino (1972–2017)
 Chico Mall – Chico (1988–present)
 Chula Vista Center – Chula Vista (1962–present)
 Citadel Outlets – Commerce (1991–present)
 City National Plaza – Downtown Los Angeles (1972–present)
 Coddingtown Mall – Santa Rosa (1962–present)
 The Collection at RiverPark – Oxnard (2012–present)
 The Commons at Calabasas – Calabasas (1998–present)
 Del Amo Fashion Center – Torrance (1961–present)
 Del Monte Center – Monterey (1967–present)
 Desert Fashion Plaza – Palm Springs (1967–1992)
 Desert Hills Premium Outlets – Cabazon (2002–present)
 Downtown Commons – Sacramento (2017–present)
 Downtown Disney – Anaheim (2001–present)
 El Cerrito Plaza – El Cerrito (1958–present)
 East Bay Science and Technology Center – Richmond (1976–present)
 Eastland Center – West Covina (1957–present)
 Eastridge Center – San Jose (1971–present)
 Fallbrook Center – West Hills, Los Angeles (1963–present)
 Fashion Fair – Fresno (1970–present)
 Fashion Island – Newport Beach (1961–present)
 Fashion Valley Mall – San Diego (1969–present)
 FIGat7th – Los Angeles (1986–present)
 Galleria at Tyler – Riverside (1970–present)
 Glendale Galleria – Glendale (1976–present)
 Great Mall of the Bay Area – Milpitas (1994–present)
 Grossmont Center – La Mesa (1961–present)
 The Grove at Farmers Market – Los Angeles (2002–present)
 Hawthorne Plaza Shopping Center – Hawthorne (1977–1999)
 Hemet Valley Mall – Hemet (1980–present)
 Hillsdale Shopping Center – San Mateo (1954–present)
 Hollywood & Highland – Los Angeles (2001–present)
 Horton Plaza Mall – San Diego (1985–2020)
 Imperial Valley Mall – El Centro (2005–present)
 Indio Fashion Mall – Indio (1975–present)
 Inland Center – San Bernardino (1966–present)
 Internet Shopping Center - San Diego (2019–present)
 Irvine Spectrum Center – Irvine (1995–present)
 La Cumbre Plaza – Santa Barbara (1967–present)
 La Habra Fashion Square – La Habra (1968–present)
 La Jolla Village Square – La Jolla (1993–present)
 La Mirada Mall – La Mirada (1970s–1990)
 Laguna Hills Mall – Laguna Hills (1973–2018)
 Lakewood Center – Lakewood (1951–present)
 Las Americas Premium Outlets – San Ysidro (2001–present)
 Long Beach Plaza – Long Beach (1982–2000)
 Long Beach Towne Center – Long Beach (1999–present)
 Los Altos Center – Long Beach (1955–present)
 Los Angeles Mall – Civic Center, Los Angeles (1974–present)
 Los Cerritos Center – Cerritos (1971–present)
 Macdonald 80 Shopping Center – Richmond (1950s–present)
 MainPlace Mall – Santa Ana (1987–present)
 Malibu Country Mart – Malibu (1975–present)
 The Mall of Victor Valley – Victorville (1987–present)
 Manhattan Village – Manhattan Beach (1982–present)
 Marina Pacifica – Long Beach (1973–present)
 Metreon – San Francisco (1999–present)
 Montclair Place – Montclair (1968–present)
 Moreno Valley Mall – Moreno Valley (1992–present)
 NewPark Mall – Newark (1980–present)
 Northgate Mall – San Rafael (1966–present)
 Northridge Fashion Center – Northridge (1971–present)
 Northridge Mall – Salinas (1974–present)
 The Oaks – Thousand Oaks (1978–present)
 One Paseo – San Diego (2019–present)
 Ontario Mills – Ontario (1996–present)
 Otay Ranch Town Center – Chula Vista (2006–present)
 The Outlets at Orange – Orange (1998–present)
 Pacific Commons – Fremont (2004–present)
 Pacific View Mall – Ventura (1964–present)
 Palm Springs Mall – Palm Springs (1959–2005)
 Panorama Mall – Panorama City (1955–present)
 Parkway Plaza – El Cajon (1972–present)
 The Paseo – Pasadena (2001–present)
 Platform – Culver City (2016–present)
 Plaza West Covina – West Covina (1962–present)
 The Promenade – Woodland Hills, Los Angeles (1973–2022)
 Promenade on the Peninsula – Rolling Hills Estates (1981–present)
 Promenade Temecula – Temecula (1999–present)
 Pruneyard Shopping Center – Campbell (1964–present)
 Puente Hills Mall – City of Industry (1974–present)
 The Quad at Whittier – Whittier (1953–present)
 Redlands Mall – Redlands (1977–2010)
 Santa Maria Town Center – Santa Maria (1976–present)
 Santa Monica Place – Santa Monica (1980–present)
 Santa Rosa Plaza – Santa Rosa (1983–present)
 Santana Row – San Jose (2002–present)
 Serramonte Center – Daly City (1969–present)
 Sherman Oaks Galleria – Sherman Oaks (2002–present)
 Sherwood Mall – Stockton (1979–present)
 The Shoppes at Carlsbad – Carlsbad (1969–present)
 The Shops and Dining at Forestland - Redding (1985–present)
 The Shops at Mission Viejo – Mission Viejo (1979–present)
 The Shops at Montebello – Montebello (1985–present)
 The Shops at Santa Anita – Arcadia (1974–present)
 The Shops at Tanforan – San Bruno (1971–present)
 Simi Valley Town Center – Simi Valley (2005–present)
 Solano Town Center – Fairfield (1981–present)
 Somersville Towne Center – Antioch (1966–present)
 South Bay Galleria – Redondo Beach (1985–present)
 South Coast Plaza – Costa Mesa (1967–present)
 SouthBay Pavilion – Carson (1973–present)
 Southland Mall – Hayward (1964–present)
 Stanford Shopping Center – Palo Alto (1955–present)
 Stoneridge Shopping Center – Pleasanton (1980–present)
 Stonestown Galleria – San Francisco (1952–present)
 Stonewood Center – Downey (1958–present)
 Sunnyvale Town Center – Sunnyvale (1979–2018)
 Sunrise Mall – Citrus Heights (1971–present)
 Sunvalley Shopping Center – Concord (1967–present)
 Town Center at Corte Madera – Corte Madera (1958–present)
 Universal CityWalk – Universal City (1993–present)
 Vallco Shopping Mall – Cupertino (1976–present)
 Valley Plaza – North Hollywood, Los Angeles (1951–present)
 Valley Plaza Mall – Bakersfield (1967–present)
 Victoria Gardens – Rancho Cucamonga (2004–present)
 The Village at Corte Madera – Corte Madera (1985–present)
 The Village at Orange – Orange (1971–present)
 Vintage Faire Mall – Modesto (1977–present)
 Visalia Mall – Visalia (1964–present)
 Weberstown Mall – Stockton (1966–present)
 West Hollywood Gateway – West Hollywood (2004–present)
 West Valley Mall – Tracy (1995–present)
 Westfield Century City – Los Angeles (1964–present)
 Westfield Culver City – Culver City (1977–present)
 Westfield Fashion Square – Sherman Oaks (1962–present)
 Westfield Galleria at Roseville – Roseville (2000–present)
 Westfield Mission Valley – San Diego (1961–present)
 Westfield North County – Escondido (1986–present)
 Westfield Oakridge – San Jose (1971–present)
 Westfield Palm Desert – Palm Desert (1982–present)
 Westfield Plaza Bonita – National City (1981–present)
 Westfield San Francisco Centre – San Francisco (1988–present)
 Westfield Topanga – Canoga Park (1964–present)
 Westfield UTC – San Diego (1977–present)
 Westfield Valencia Town Center – Santa Clarita (1992–present)
 Westfield Valley Fair – San Jose (1986–present)
 Westgate Center – San Jose (1975–present)
 Westlake Shopping Center – Daly City (1951–present)
 Westminster Mall – Westminster (1974–present)
 Westside Pavilion – West Los Angeles (1985–2019)
 Whittwood Town Center – Whittier (1961–present)
 The Willows Shopping Center – Concord (1977–present)
 Yuba Sutter Mall – Yuba City (1990–present)

Colorado 

 Belmar – Lakewood (2004–present)
 Chapel Hills Mall – Colorado Springs (1982–present)
 Cherry Creek Shopping Center – Denver (1953–present)
 The Citadel – Colorado Springs (1972–present)
 Colorado Mills – Lakewood (2002–present)
 FlatIron Crossing – Broomfield (2000–present)
 Greeley Mall – Greeley (1973–present)
 Mesa Mall – Grand Junction (1980–present)
 Northfield Stapleton – Denver (2005–present)
 Park Meadows – Lone Tree (1996–present)
 Pueblo Mall – Pueblo (1976–present)
 The Shops at Foothills – Fort Collins (1973–present)
 Southlands Lifestyle Center – Aurora (2005–present)
 Southwest Plaza – Littleton (1983–present)
 Streets at Southglenn – Centennial (2009–present)
 Town Center at Aurora – Aurora (1975–present)
 Twenty Ninth Street – Boulder (2006–present)
 Westminster Mall – Westminster (1977–2011)

Connecticut 

 Blue Back Square – West Hartford (2008–present)
 Brass Mill Center – Waterbury (1997–present)
 Chapel Square Mall – New Haven (1967–2002)
 Connecticut Post Mall – Milford (1960–present)
 Crystal Mall – Waterford (1984–present)
 Danbury Fair – Danbury (1986–present)
 East Brook Mall – Mansfield (1975–present)
 Enfield Square – Enfield (1971–present)
 Meriden Mall – Meriden (1971–present)
 The Shoppes at Buckland Hills – Manchester (1990–present)
 The SoNo Collection – Norwalk (Fall 2019–present)
 Stamford Town Center – Stamford (1982–present)
 Westfarms – West Hartford (1974–present)
 Westfield Trumbull – Trumbull (1964–present)

Delaware 
 Christiana Mall – Newark (1978–present)
 Concord Mall – Wilmington (1965–present)
 Dover Mall – Dover (1982–present)
 Tri-State Mall – Claymont (1967-2015)

District of Columbia 
 CityCenterDC – Washington (2015–present)
 DC USA – Washington (2008–present)
 Gallery Place – Washington (2004–present)
 Georgetown Park – Washington (1981–present)
 L'Enfant Plaza – Washington (1968–present)
 Mazza Gallerie – Washington (1977–2022)
 The Shops at National Place – Washington (1984–2020)

Florida 

 Altamonte Mall – Altamonte Springs (1974–present)
 Artegon Marketplace – Orlando (2002–2017)
 Aventura Mall – Aventura (1983–present)
 The Avenues – Jacksonville (1990–present)
 Bal Harbour Shops – Bal Harbour (1965–present)
 Bayside Marketplace – Downtown Miami (1987–present)
 Boynton Beach Mall – Boynton Beach (1985–present)
 Brickell City Centre – Brickell, Miami (2016–present)
 Coastland Center – Naples (1977–present)
 Coconut Point – Estero (2005–present)
 CocoWalk – Miami (1990–present)
 Coral Square – Coral Springs (1984–present)
 Cordova Mall – Pensacola (1971–present)
 Crystal River Mall – Crystal River (1990–2022)
 Dadeland Mall – Kendall (1962–present)
 Dolphin Mall – Miami (2001–present)
 Eagle Ridge Mall – Lake Wales (1996–present)
 Edison Mall – Fort Myers (1965–present)
 The Falls – Kendall (1980–present)
 Festival Flea Market Mall – Coconut Creek (1991–present)
 The Florida Mall – Orange County (1986–present)
 The Galleria at Fort Lauderdale – Fort Lauderdale (1980–present)
 The Gardens Mall – Palm Beach Gardens (1988–present)
 Governor's Square – Tallahassee (1979–present)
 Gulf Coast Town Center – Fort Myers (2005–present)
 Gulf View Square – Port Richey (1980–present)
 Indian River Mall – Vero Beach (1996–present)
 International Plaza and Bay Street – Tampa (2001–present)
 Lake Square Mall – Leesburg (1980–present)
 Lakeland Square Mall – Lakeland (1988–present)
 Lakeshore Mall – Sebring (1992–present)
 The Mall at 163rd Street – North Miami Beach (1956–present)
 The Mall at Millenia – Orlando (2002–present)
 Mall at University Town Center – Sarasota (2014–present)
 The Mall at Wellington Green – Wellington (2001–present)
 Mall of the Americas – Miami (1970–present)
 Melbourne Square – Melbourne (1982–present)
 Merritt Square Mall – Merritt Island (1970–present)
 Miami International Mall – Doral (1983–present)
 Midtown DeSoto Square Mall – Bradenton (1973–2021)
 Miracle Marketplace – Miami (1989–present)
 The Oaks Mall – Gainesville (1978–present)
 Ocean Walk Shoppes – Daytona Beach (2001–present)
 Orange Park Mall – Orange Park (1975–present)
 Orlando Fashion Square – Orlando (1973–present)
 Oviedo Mall – Oviedo (1998–present)
 Paddock Mall – Ocala (1980–present)
 Palm Beach Outlets – West Palm Beach (2014–present)
 Pembroke Lakes Mall – Pembroke Pines (1992–present)
 Pier Park – Panama City Beach (2008–present)
 Pompano Citi Centre – Pompano Beach (1970–present)
 Port Charlotte Town Center – Port Charlotte (1989–present)
 Regency Square Mall – Jacksonville (1967–present)
 River City Marketplace – Jacksonville (2006–present)
 Rosemary Square – West Palm Beach (2000–present)
 St. Johns Town Center – Jacksonville (2005–present)
 Santa Rosa Mall – Mary Esther (1976–present)
 Sarasota Square Mall – Sarasota (1977–present)
 Sawgrass Mills – Sunrise (1990–present)
 Seminole Towne Center – Sanford (1995–present)
 The Shops at Mary Brickell Village – Brickell, Miami (2006–present)
 Shops at Merrick Park – Coral Gables (2002–present)
 The Shops at Sunset Place – South Miami (1999–present)
 Southland Mall – Cutler Bay (1960–present)
 Town Center at Boca Raton – Boca Raton (1980–present)
 Treasure Coast Square – Martin County (1987–present)
 Tyrone Square Mall – St. Petersburg (1972–present)
 University Mall – Tampa (1974–present)
 Volusia Mall – Daytona Beach (1974–present)
 Waterside Shops – Naples (1992–present)
 West Oaks Mall – Ocoee (1996–present)
 Westfield Brandon – Brandon (1995–present)
 Westfield Broward – Plantation (1978–present)
 Westfield Citrus Park – Citrus Park (1999–present)
 Westfield Countryside – Clearwater (1975–present)
 Westfield Siesta Key – Sarasota (1956–present)
 Westland Mall – Hialeah (1971–present)
 WestShore Plaza – Tampa (1967–present)

Georgia 

 Avalon – Alpharetta (2014–present)
 Abercorn Common – Savannah (1968–present)
 Albany Mall – Albany (1976–present)
 Arbor Place – Douglasville (1999–present)
 Atlantic Station – Atlanta (2005–present)
 Augusta Mall – Augusta (1978–present)
 Buckhead Atlanta – Atlanta (2014–present)
 Cumberland Mall – Smyrna (1973–present)
 Dalton Mall – Dalton (1980–present)
 Gallery at South DeKalb – Decatur (1968–present)
 Georgia Square Mall – Athens (1981–present)
 Greenbriar Mall – Atlanta (1965–present)
 Gwinnett Place Mall – Duluth (1984–present)
 Houston County Galleria – Centerville (1994–present)
 LaGrange Mall – LaGrange (1979–present)
 Lakeshore Mall – Gainesville (1970–present)
 Lenox Square – Atlanta (1959–present)
 Macon Mall – Macon (1975–present)
 The Mall at Stonecrest – Lithonia (2001–present)
 Mall of Georgia – Buford (1999–present)
 Mount Berry Mall – Rome (1991–present)
 North DeKalb Mall – Decatur (1965–2020)
 North Point Mall – Alpharetta (1993–present)
 Northlake Mall – Atlanta (1971–present)
 Oglethorpe Mall – Savannah (1969–present)
 Peachtree Mall – Columbus (1975–present)
 Perimeter Mall – Dunwoody (1971–present)
 Phipps Plaza – Atlanta (1969–present)
 Savannah Mall – Savannah (1990–present)
 The Shoppes at River Crossing – Macon (2008–present)
 Southlake Mall – Morrow (1976–present)
 Sugarloaf Mills – Lawrenceville (2001–present)
 Town Center at Cobb – Cobb County (1986–present)
 Union Station (Shannon Mall) – Union City (1980–2010)
 Valdosta Mall – Valdosta (1983–present)

Guam 
 Agana Shopping Center – Hagåtña (1978–present)
 Guam Premier Outlets — Tamuning (Unknown–present)
 Micronesia Mall – Dededo (1988–present)

Hawaii 

Ala Moana Center – Honolulu, Oahu (1959–present)
International Market Place – Honolulu, Oahu (2016–present)
Kahala Mall – Honolulu, Oahu (1954–present)
Kukui Grove Center – Lihue, Kauai (1982–present)
Pearlridge Center – Aiea, Oahu (1972–present)
Prince Kuhio Plaza – Hilo, Hawaii (1985–present)
Royal Hawaiian Center – Honolulu, Oahu (1979–present)
Windward Mall – Honolulu, Oahu (1982–present)

Idaho 

 Boise Towne Square – Boise (1988–present)
 District 208 – Nampa (1965–present)
 Grand Teton Mall – Idaho Falls (1984–present)
 Magic Valley Mall – Twin Falls (1986–present)
 Nampa Gateway Center – Nampa (2007–present)
 Palouse Mall – Moscow (1976–present)
 Pine Ridge Mall – Chubbuck (1981–present)
 Silver Lake Mall – Coeur d'Alene (1989–present)

Illinois 

 108 North State Street – Chicago (2008–present)
 900 North Michigan Shops – Chicago (1988–present)
 Algonquin Commons – Algonquin (2004–present)
 Alton Square Mall – Alton (1978–present)
 The Arboretum of South Barrington – South Barrington (2008–present)
 Arlington Town Square – Arlington Heights (2000–present)
 Belvidere Discount Mall – Waukegan (1965–present)
 Charlestowne Mall – St. Charles (1991–2017)
 Cherryvale Mall – Rockford (1973–present)
 Chicago Place – Chicago (1991–2009)
 Chicago Ridge Mall – Chicago Ridge (1981–present)
 Cross County Mall – Mattoon (1971–present)
 Deer Park Town Center – Deer Park (2000–present)
 Deerbrook Mall – Deerfield (1971–present)
 Deerfield Square – Deerfield (2000–present)
 Dixie Square Mall – Harvey (1966–1978)
 Eastland Mall – Bloomington (1967–present)
 Fashion Outlets of Chicago – Rosemont (2013–present)
 Ford City Mall – Chicago (1965–present)
 Fox Valley Mall – Aurora (1975–present)
 Galleria Center – Algonquin (2006–present)
 Geneva Commons – Geneva (2002–present)
 Golf Mill Shopping Center – Niles (1960–present)
 Gurnee Mills – Gurnee (1991–present)
 Harlem Irving Plaza – Norridge (1956–present)
 Hawthorn Mall – Vernon Hills (1973–present)
 Hickory Point Mall – Forsyth (1978–present)
 Illinois Star Centre – Marion (1991–2018) 
 James R. Thompson Center – Chicago (1985–present)
 Lakehurst Mall – Waukegan (1971–2004) 
 Lincoln Mall – Matteson (1973–2015)
 Lincolnshire Commons – Lincolnshire (2006–present)
 Lincolnwood Town Center – Lincolnwood (1990–present)
 Louis Joliet Mall – Joliet (1978–present)
 Machesney Park Mall – Machesney Park (1978–2003) 
 Market Place Shopping Center – Champaign (1975–present)
 Navy Pier – Chicago (1916–present)
 North Park Plaza – Villa Park (1980–present)
 North Pier – Chicago (1985-1997)
 North Riverside Park Mall – North Riverside (1975–present)
 Northbrook Court – Northbrook (1976–present)
 Northfield Square – Bradley (1990–present)
 Northland Mall – Sterling (1973–present)
 Northwoods Mall – Peoria (1973–present)
 Oakbrook Center – Oak Brook (1962–present)
 Orland Square Mall – Orland Park (1976–present)
 Park Forest Plaza – Park Forest (1949–1996)
 Peru Mall – Peru (1974–present)
 The Plaza – Evergreen Park (1952–2013)
 Plaza del Lago – Wilmette (1928–present)
 The Promenade Bolingbrook – Bolingbrook (2007–present)
 The Quentin Collection – Kildeer (2005–present)
 Quincy Mall – Quincy (1978–present)
 Randhurst Village – Mount Prospect (2011–present)
 Renaissance Place – Highland Park (2007–present)
 River Oaks Center – Calumet City (1966–present)
 Sandburg Mall – Galesburg (1975–2018)
 The Shoppes at College Hills – Normal (2005–present)
 The Shops at North Bridge – Chicago (2000–present)
 SouthPark Mall – Moline (1974–present)
 Spring Hill Mall – West Dundee (1980–present)
 St. Clair Square – Fairview Heights (1974–present)
 Stratford Square Mall – Bloomingdale (1981–present)
 The Streets of Woodfield – Schaumburg (2000–present)
 Sutton Park Shopping Center – Streamwood (1975–present)
 University Mall – Carbondale (1974–present)
 Village Mall – Danville (1975–present)
 Water Tower Place – Chicago (1976–present)
 Westfield Old Orchard – Skokie (1956–present)
 Westridge Court – Naperville (1990–present)
 White Oaks Mall – Springfield (1977–present)
 Woodfield Mall – Schaumburg (1971–present)
 Yorktown Center – Lombard (1968–present)

Indiana 

 Castleton Square – Indianapolis (1972–present)
 Century Mall – Merrillville (1979–2001)
 Circle Centre – Indianapolis (1995–present)
 Clay Terrace – Carmel (2004–present)
 College Mall – Bloomington (1965–present)
 Concord Mall – Elkhart (1972–present)
 Eastland Mall – Evansville (1981–present)
 Erskine Village – South Bend (2005–present)
 The Fashion Mall at Keystone – Indianapolis (1973–present)
 Five Points Mall – Marion (1978–2019)
 Glenbrook Square – Fort Wayne (1966–present)
 Glendale Town Center – Indianapolis (1958–present)
 Green Tree Mall – Clarksville (1968–present)
 Greenwood Park Mall – Greenwood (1967–present)
 Hamilton Town Center – Noblesville (2008–present)
 Haute City Center – Terre Haute (1968–present)
 Jefferson Pointe – Fort Wayne (2001–present)
 Kokomo Town Center – Kokomo (1963–present)
 Lafayette Square Mall – Indianapolis (1968–present)
 Lighthouse Place Premium Outlets – Michigan City (1987–present)
 Markland Mall – Kokomo (1968–present)
 Mounds Mall – Anderson (1965–2018)
 Muncie Mall – Muncie (1970–present)
 River Falls Mall – Clarksville (1990–present)
 Southlake Mall – Merrillville (1974–present)
 Southtown Mall – Fort Wayne (1969–2003)
 Tippecanoe Mall – Lafayette (1974–present)
 University Park Mall – Mishawaka (1979–present)
 The Village Shopping Center – Gary (1955–present)
 Washington Square Mall – Evansville (1963–present)
 Washington Square Mall – Indianapolis (1974–present)
 Woodmar Mall – Hammond (1954–2006)

Iowa 

 Coral Ridge Mall – Coralville (1998–present)
 Crossroads Mall – Waterloo (1969–present)
 Jordan Creek Town Center – West Des Moines (2004–present)
 Kaleidoscope at the Hub – Des Moines (1985–2019)
 Kennedy Mall – Dubuque (1970–present)
 Lindale Mall – Cedar Rapids (1960–present)
 Merle Hay Mall – Des Moines (1959–present)
 North Grand Mall – Ames (1971–present)
 NorthPark Mall – Davenport (1973–present)
 Old Capitol Mall – Iowa City (1981–present)
 Quincy Place Mall – Ottumwa (1990–present)
 Southern Hills Mall – Sioux City (1980–present)
 Southridge Mall – Des Moines (1975–present)
 Valley West Mall – West Des Moines (1975–present)
 Westdale Mall – Cedar Rapids (1979–2014)

Kansas 

 The Great Mall of the Great Plains – Olathe (1997–2015. Demolished except for Burlington)
 Indian Springs Mall – Kansas City (1971–2011. Demolished)
 Leavenworth Plaza – Leavenworth (1967–2015. Demolished except for ACE Hardware and the former Sears)
 Legends Outlets Kansas City – Kansas City (2006–present. Outdoor outlet mall)
 Manhattan Town Center – Manhattan (1987–present)
 Metcalf South Shopping Center – Overland Park (1967–2014. Demolished except for the former Sears)
 Mission Center Mall – Mission (1956–2006. Demolished)
 Oak Park Mall – Overland Park (1974–present. Largest mall in Kansas and the Kansas City Metropolitan Area)
 Town Center Plaza – Leawood (1996–present. Outdoor mall. Formerly home to the only Jacobson's Department Store in both Kansas City and the state of Kansas)
 Towne East Square – Wichita (1975–present)
 Towne West Square – Wichita (1980–present)
 West Ridge Mall – Topeka (1988–present)

Kentucky 

 Ashland Town Center – Ashland (1989–present)
 Bashford Manor Mall – Louisville (1973–2001)
 Fayette Mall – Lexington (1971–present)
 Florence Mall – Florence (1976–present)
 Fourth Street Live! – Louisville (2004–present)
 Greenwood Mall – Bowling Green (1979–present)
 Hamburg Pavilion – Lexington (1997–present)
 Jefferson Mall – Louisville (1978–present)
 Kentucky Oaks Mall – Paducah (1982–present)
 Kyova Mall – Ashland (1989–present)
 Lexington Mall – Lexington (1975–2005)
 Mall at Lexington Green – Lexington (1986–present)
 Mall St. Matthews – Louisville (1962–present)
 Mid-City Mall – Louisville (1962–present)
 Middlesboro Mall – Middlesboro (1983–present)
 Newport on the Levee – Newport (2001–present)
 Outlet Shoppes of the Bluegrass – Simpsonville (2014–present)
 Oxmoor Center – Louisville (1971–present)
 Paddock Shops – Louisville (2001–present)
 South Side Mall – South Williamson (1981–present)
 Towne Square Mall – Owensboro (1978–present)
 Turfland Mall – Lexington (1967–2008)

Louisiana 

 Acadiana Mall – Lafayette (1979–present)
 Alexandria Mall – Alexandria (1973–present)
 Cortana Mall – Baton Rouge (1976–2019)
 The Esplanade – Kenner (1983–present)
 Lakeside Shopping Center – Metairie (1960–present)
 Louisiana Boardwalk – Bossier City (2005–present)
 Mall of Louisiana – Baton Rouge (1997–present)
 Mall St. Vincent – Shreveport (1977–present)
 North Shore Square – Slidell (1985–2019)
 Oakwood Center – Gretna (1966–present)
 The Outlet Collection at Riverwalk – New Orleans (1986–present)
 Pecanland Mall – Monroe (1985–present)
 Pierre Bossier Mall – Bossier City (1982–present)
 Prien Lake Mall – Lake Charles (1972–present)
 Southland Mall – Houma (1969–present)

Maine 
 Aroostook Centre Mall – Presque Isle (1993–present)
 Auburn Mall – Auburn (1979–present)
 Bangor Mall – Bangor (1978–present)
 Maine Mall – South Portland (1971–present)

Maryland 

 Arundel Mills – Hanover (2000–present)
 Beltway Plaza Mall – Greenbelt (1963–present)
 The Boulevard at the Capital Centre – Landover (2003–2017)
 Bowie Town Center – Bowie (2001–present)
 Capital Plaza Mall – Landover Hills (1963–2005)
 The Centre at Forestville – Forestville (1979–present)
 The Centre at Golden Ring – Rosedale (1974–present)
 The Centre at Salisbury – Salisbury (1990–present)
 Country Club Mall – LaVale (1981–present)
 Eastpoint Mall – Dundalk (1956–present)
 Ellsworth Place – Silver Spring (1992–present)
 Francis Scott Key Mall – Frederick (1978–present)
 Frederick Towne Mall – Frederick (1972–2013)
 Hagerstown Premium Outlets – Hagerstown (1998–present)
 Harborplace – Baltimore (1980–present)
 Harford Mall – Bel Air (1973–present)
 Harundale Mall – Glen Burnie (1958–1997)
 Hunt Valley Towne Centre – Hunt Valley (2000–present)
 Lakeforest Mall – Gaithersburg (1978–present)
 Landover Mall – Landover (1972–2002)
 Laurel Mall – Laurel (1979–2012)
 The Mall at Prince Georges – Hyattsville (1959–present)
 The Mall in Columbia – Columbia (1971–present)
 Marley Station Mall – Glen Burnie (1987–present)
 Mondawmin Mall – Baltimore (1956–present)
 Old Town Mall – Baltimore (1968–Unknown)
 Owings Mills Mall – Owings Mills (1986–2015)
 Reisterstown Road Plaza – Baltimore (1962–present)
 Rockville Mall – Rockville (1972–1995)
 The Rotunda – Baltimore (1971–present)
 Salisbury Mall – Salisbury (1968–2004)
 Savage Mill – Savage (1985–present)
 Security Square Mall – Woodlawn (1972–present)
 Severna Park Mall – Severna Park (1975–2000)
 St. Charles Towne Center – St. Charles (1988–present)
 The Shops at Iverson – Hillcrest Heights (1967–present)
 The Shops at Kenilworth – Towson (1979–present)
 Towne Centre at Laurel – Laurel (2014–present)
 TownMall of Westminster – Westminster (1987–present)
 Towson Place – Towson, Maryland (1962–present)
 Towson Square – Towson (2013–present)
 Towson Town Center – Towson (1959–present)
 Valley Mall – Hagerstown (1974–present)
 Westfield Annapolis – Annapolis (1980–present)
 Westfield Montgomery – Bethesda (1968–present)
 Westfield Wheaton – Wheatland (1960–present)
 Westview Mall – Catonsville (1958–2002)
 White Flint Mall – Rockville (1977–2015)
 White Marsh Mall – White Marsh (1981–present)

Massachusetts 

 Arsenal Yards – Watertown (2020–present)
 Auburn Mall – Auburn (1971–present)
 Berkshire Mall – Lanesborough (1988–2019)
 Burlington Mall – Burlington (1968–present)
 CambridgeSide – Cambridge (1990–present)
 Cape Cod Factory Outlet Mall – Bourne (2012–present)
 Cape Cod Mall – Hyannis (1970–present)
 Colony Place – Plymouth (2004–present)
 Copley Place – Boston (1983–present)
 Dartmouth Mall – North Dartmouth (1971–present)
 Eastfield Mall – Springfield (1967–present)
 Emerald Square – Attleboro (1989–present)
 Greendale Mall – Worcester (1987–2021)
 Hampshire Mall – Hadley (1978–present)
 Hanover Crossing – Hanover (1971–2020)
 Holyoke Mall at Ingleside – Holyoke (1979–present)
 Kingston Collection – Kingston (1989–present)
 Liberty Tree Mall – Danvers (1972–present)
 The Loop – Methuen (1999–present)
 The Mall at Whitney Field – Leominster (1967–present)
 Mountain Farms Mall – Hadley (1973–present)
 Natick Mall – Natick (1966–present)
 Northshore Mall - Peabody (1958–present)
 Patriot Place – Foxborough (2007–present)
 Prudential Center – Boston (1993–present)
 Shopper's World – Framingham (1951–present)
 The Shoppes at Blackstone Valley – Millbury (2004–present)
 Shops at Billerica – Billerica (1975–present)
 The Shops at Chestnut Hill – Newton (1974–present)
 Silver City Galleria – Taunton (1992–2021)
 Solomon Pond Mall – Marlborough (with the northern part of the mall in Berlin) (1996–present)
 South Shore Plaza – Braintree (1961–present)
 SouthCoast Marketplace – Fall River (2017–present)
 Square One Mall – Saugus (1994–present)
 Swansea Mall – Swansea (1975–2019)
 Westgate Mall – Brockton (1963–present)
 Worcester Center Galleria – Worcester (1971–2006)

Michigan 

 Adrian Mall – Adrian (1970–2020)
 Alpena Mall – Alpena (1980–present)
 Arborland Center – Ann Arbor (1961–present)
 Bay City Town Center – Bay City (1991–present)
 Birch Run Premium Outlets – Birch Run (1986–present)
 Birchwood Mall – Port Huron (1991–present)
 Briarwood Mall – Ann Arbor (1973–present)
 Brighton Mall – Brighton (1971–present)
 Cherryland Center – Traverse City (1976–1999)
 Courtland Center – Burton (1968–present)
 The Crossroads – Portage (1980–present)
 Dort Mall – Flint (1965–present)
 Eastland Center – Harper Woods (1957–2021)
 Eastwood Towne Center – Lansing Charter Township (2002–present)
 Fairlane Green – Allen Park (2005–present)
 Fairlane Town Center – Dearborn (1976–present)
 Fashion Square Mall – Saginaw (1972–present)
 Fort Saginaw Mall – Saginaw (1966–late 1990s)
 Frandor Shopping Center – Lansing (1954–present)
 Gateway Marketplace – Detroit (2013–present)
 Genesee Valley Center – Flint (1970–present)
 Grand Traverse Mall – Traverse City (1992–present)
 Great Lakes Crossing Outlets – Auburn Hills (1998–present)
 Green Oak Village Place – Brighton (2006–present)
 Hampton Towne Centre – Essexville (1975–2010)
 Jackson Crossing – Jackson (1961–present)
 Kalamazoo Mall – Kalamazoo (1959–present)
 The Lakes Mall – Muskegon (2001–present)
 Lakeside Mall – Sterling Heights (1976–present)
 Lakeview Square Mall – Battle Creek (1983–present)
 Lansing Mall – Delta Charter Township (1969–present)
 Laurel Park Place – Livonia (1989–present)
 Lincoln Park Shopping Center – Lincoln Park (with a portion in Allen Park) (1956–2019)
 Livonia Marketplace – Livonia (2010–present)
 Macomb Mall – Roseville (1964–present)
 The Mall at Partridge Creek – Clinton Township (2007–present)
 The Mall of Monroe – Monroe (1988–present)
 Maple Hill Pavilion – Kalamazoo (1971–present)
 Meridian Mall – Okemos (1969–present)
 Midland Mall – Midland (1991–present)
 Muskegon Mall – Muskegon (1976–2001)
 Northland Center – Southfield (1954–2015)
 Novi Town Center – Novi (1987–present)
 Oakland Mall – Troy (1968–present)
 The Orchards Mall – Benton Harbor (1979–present)
 Renaissance Center – Detroit (1977–present)
 RiverTown Crossings – Grandville (1999–present)
 Rogers Plaza – Wyoming (1961–present)
 Shops at CenterPoint – Kentwood (1967–present)
 The Shops at Westshore – Holland (1988–present)
 Somerset Collection – Troy (1969–present)
 Southgate Shopping Center – Southgate (1957–present)
 Southland Center – Taylor (1970–present)
 Summit Place Mall – Waterford Township (1962–2009)
 Tel-Twelve Mall – Southfield (1968–present)
 Twelve Mile Crossing at Fountain Walk – Novi (2002–present)
 Twelve Oaks Mall – Novi (1977–present)
 Universal Mall – Warren (1965–present)
 The Village of Rochester Hills – Rochester (2002–present)
 Westland Shopping Center – Westland (1965–present)
 Westwood Mall – Jackson (1972–present)
 Wonderland Village – Livonia (1959–present)
 Woodland Mall – Kentwood (1968–present)

Minnesota 

 Albertville Premium Outlets – Albertville (2000–present)
 Apache Mall – Rochester (1969–present)
 Apache Plaza – St. Anthony (1961–2004)
 Arbor Lakes – Maple Grove (1997–present)
 Bandana Square – Saint Paul (1984–2003)
 Brookdale Center – Brooklyn Center (1962–2010)
 Burnsville Center – Burnsville (1977–present)
 Cray Plaza – Saint Paul (1986–present)
 Crossroads Center – St. Cloud (1966–present)
 Eden Prairie Center – Eden Prairie (1976–present)
 Four Seasons Mall – Plymouth (1978–2012)
 Galleria Edina – Edina (1976–present)
 Gaviidae Common – Minneapolis (1989–present)
 Har Mar Mall – Roseville (1963–present)
 Mall of America – Bloomington (1992–present)
 Maplewood Mall – Maplewood (1974–present)
 Midtown Square Mall – St. Cloud (1982–present)
 Miller Hill Mall – Duluth (1973–present)
 Minneapolis City Center – Minneapolis (1983–present)
 Nicollet Mall – Minneapolis (1967–present)
 Northtown Mall – Blaine (1972–present)
 Paul Bunyan Mall – Bemidji (1977–present)
 Ridgedale Center – Minnetonka (1974–present)
 River Hills Mall – Mankato (1991–present)
 Riverdale Village – Coon Rapids (2002–present)
 Rosedale Center – Roseville (1969–present)
 Saint Anthony Main – Minneapolis (1980s–present)
 Seven Points – Minneapolis (1984–present)
 Shingle Creek Crossing – Brooklyn Center (2012–present)
 Silver Lake Village – St. Anthony (2004–present)
 Shoppes at Knollwood – St. Louis Park (1955–present)
 Southdale Center – Edina (1956–present)
 Southtown Center – Bloomington (1960–present)
 Ultra Outlets of Medford – Medford (1991–present)
 Wayzata Bay Center – Wayzata (1967–2011)
 Woodbury Lakes – Woodbury (2005–present)

Mississippi 

 Edgewater Mall – Biloxi (1963–present)
 Mall at Barnes Crossing – Tupelo (1990–present)
 Metrocenter Mall – Jackson (1978–2018)
 Northpark Mall – Ridgeland (1984–present)
 Outlets of Mississippi – Pearl (2013–present)
 Southaven Towne Center – Southaven (2005–present)
 Turtle Creek Mall – Hattiesburg (1994–present)
 Uptown McComb (formerly Edgewood Mall) – McComb (1987–present)
 Uptown Meridian (formerly Bonita Lakes Mall) – Meridian (1997–present)

Missouri 

 Antioch Crossing, Antioch Center – Kansas City (1956–2012. Redeveloped. The majority of the mall was demolished)
 Bannister Mall – Kansas City (1980–2007. Redeveloped as the headquarters campus for Cerner. Demolished.) 
 Battlefield Mall – Springfield (1970–present)
 Blue Ridge Crossing, Blue Ridge Mall – Kansas City (1957–present. Redeveloped. The enclosed mall was demolished for redevelopment.)
 Capital Mall – Jefferson City (1978–present)
 Chesterfield Mall – Chesterfield (1976–present)
 Columbia Mall – Columbia (1985–present)
 Country Club Plaza – Kansas City (1923–present)
 Crestwood Court – Crestwood (1957–2013)
 The Crossings at Northwest, Northwest Plaza – St. Ann (1963–2010. Redeveloped. Most of the mall was demolished)
 Crown Center – Kansas City (1971–present)
 East Hills Mall – St. Joseph (1965–present)
 Independence Center – Independence (1974–present)
 Jamestown Mall – Florissant (1973–2014)
 Metro North Mall – Kansas City (1976–2014. Demolished except for Macy's)
 Mid Rivers Mall – St. Peters (1987–present)
 Northpark Mall – Joplin (1972–present)
 Plaza Frontenac – Frontenac (1974–present)
 Powerplex STL – Hazelwood (2003–present)
 River Roads Mall – Jennings (1962–1995)
 Saint Louis Galleria – Richmond Heights (1984–present)
 South County Center – St. Louis (1963–present)
 Summit Fair – Lee's Summit (2009–present)
 Summit Woods Crossing – Lee's Summit (2001–present)
 Union Station – St. Louis (1985–present)
 Ward Parkway Center – Kansas City (1959–present. Redeveloped. Large chunks of the mall were demolished during redevelopment. A small enclosed area remains)
 West County Center – Des Peres (2002–present)
 West Park Mall – Cape Girardeau (1981–present)
 Zona Rosa – Kansas City (2004–present)

Montana 
 Gallatin Valley Mall – Bozeman (1980–present)
 Holiday Village Mall – Great Falls (1959–present)
 Kalispell Center Mall - Kalispell (1986-present)
 Rimrock Mall – Billings (1975–present)
 Southgate Mall – Missoula (1978–present)

Nebraska 

 Conestoga Mall – Grand Island (1974–present)
 Crossroads Mall – Omaha (1960–2020)
 Gateway Mall – Lincoln (1960–present)
 Oak View Mall – Omaha (1991–present)
 Southroads Mall – Bellevue (1966–present)
 Westroads Mall – Omaha (1967–present)

Nevada 

 The Boulevard Mall – Paradise (1968–present)
 Downtown Summerlin – Summerlin (2014–present)
 Fashion Show Mall – Paradise (1981–present)
 The Forum Shops at Caesars – Paradise (1992–present)
 Galleria at Sunset – Henderson (1996–present)
 Grand Canal Shoppes – Paradise (1999–present)
 Meadowood Mall – Reno (1978–present)
 Meadows Mall – Las Vegas (1978–present)
 Miracle Mile Shops – Paradise (2000–present)
 Outlets at Legends – Sparks (2008–present)
 The Summit – Reno (2007–present)
 Town Square – Paradise (2007–present)

New Hampshire 

 Mall at Fox Run – Newington (1983–present)
 Mall at Rockingham Park – Salem (1991–present)
 Mall of New Hampshire – Manchester (1977–present)
 Merrimack Premium Outlets – Merrimack (2012–present)
 Pheasant Lane Mall – Nashua (1986–present)
 Settlers Green – North Conway (1988–present)
 Steeplegate Mall – Concord (1990–present)

New Jersey 

 American Dream Meadowlands – East Rutherford (2019–present)
 Bergen Town Center – Paramus (1957–present)
 Bridgewater Commons – Bridgewater Township (1988–present)
 Brunswick Square – East Brunswick (1970–present)
 Burlington Center Mall – Burlington Township (1982–2018)
 Center City Mall – Paterson (2008–present)
 Cherry Hill Mall – Cherry Hill (1961–present)
 Cumberland Mall – Vineland (1973–present)
 Deptford Mall – Deptford Township (1975–present)
 East Gate Square – Moorestown/Mount Laurel (1993–present)
 Elizabeth Center – Elizabeth (1990–present)
 Fashion Center – Paramus (1967–present)
 Forrestal Village – Plainsboro Township (1986–present)
 Freehold Raceway Mall – Freehold Township (1990–present)
 Garden State Plaza – Paramus (1957–present)
 The Grove at Shrewsbury – Shrewsbury (1988–present)
 Hamilton Mall – Mays Landing (1987–present)
 Harbor Square – Egg Harbor Township (1968–present)
 Lackawanna Terminal (Unknown–present)
 Livingston Mall – Livingston (1972–present)
 Main Street Complex – Voorhees Township (1988–present)
 The Mall at Mill Creek – Secaucus (1986–present)
 The Mall at Short Hills – Short Hills (1961–present)
 Manalapan EpiCentre – Manalapan Township (2002–present)
 MarketFair Mall – Princeton (1987–present)
 Menlo Park Mall – Edison (1959–present)
 The Mills at Jersey Gardens – Elizabeth (1999–present)
 Monmouth Mall – Eatontown (1960–present)
 Moorestown Mall – Moorestown (1963–present)
 Newport Centre – Jersey City (1987–present)
 Ocean County Mall – Toms River (1976–present)
 Paramus Park – Paramus (1974–present)
 Phillipsburg Mall – Phillipsburg (1989–2020)
 Pier Village – Long Branch (2005–present)
 Playground Pier – Atlantic City (1906–present)
 The Plaza at Harmon Meadow – Secaucus (Unknown–present)
 Princeton Shopping Center – Princeton (1954–present)
 The Promenade at Sagemore – Evesham Township (2001–present)
 Quaker Bridge Mall – Lawrence Township (1975–present)
 The Quarter at Tropicana – Atlantic City (2004–present)
 Rockaway Townsquare – Rockaway Township (1977–present)
 Seacourt Pavilion – Toms River (1988–present)
 Seaview Square Mall – Ocean Township (1977–2000)
 The Shops at Ledgewood Commons – Ledgweood (1972–present)
 The Shops at Riverside – Hackensack (1977–present)
 Tanger Outlets The Walk – Atlantic City (2003–present)
 Voorhees Town Center – Voorhees Township (1970–present)
 Wayne Towne Center – Wayne (1974–present)
 Willowbrook Mall – Wayne (1969–present)
 Woodbridge Center – Woodbridge Township (1971–present)

New Mexico 

 ABQ Uptown – Albuquerque (2006–present)
 Animas Valley Mall – Farmington (1982–present)
 Coronado Center – Albuquerque (1965–present)
 Cottonwood Mall – Albuquerque (1996–present)
 DeVargas Center – Santa Fe (1973–present)
 Fashion Outlets of Santa Fe – Santa Fe (1993–present)
 Mesilla Valley Mall – Las Cruces (1981–present)
 North Plains Mall – Clovis (1985–present)
 Santa Fe Place – Santa Fe (1985–present)
 Winrock Town Center – Albuquerque (1961–2011)

New York 

 Americana Manhasset – Manhasset (1956–present)
 Arnot Mall – Big Flats (1967–present)
 Atlantic Terminal – Brooklyn (2004–present)
 Aviation Mall – Glens Falls North (1975–present)
 Bay Plaza Shopping Center – Co-op City, Bronx (1988–present)
 Boulevard Mall – Amherst (1962–present)
 Broadway Commons – Hicksville (1956–present)
 Brookfield Place – Battery Park City, Manhattan (1988–present)
 Champlain Centre – Plattsburgh (1987–present)
 Chautauqua Mall – Lakewood (1971–present)
 Clifton Park Center – Clifton Park (1976–present)
 Colonie Center – Roessleville (1966–present)
 Colvin Central Plaza – Albany (1981–2001)
 Crossgates Commons – Westmere (1984–present)
 Crossgates Mall – Westmere (1984–present)
 Crosstown Plaza – Schenectady (1970s–present)
 Destiny USA – Syracuse (1990–present)
 Eastern Hills Mall – Harris Hill (1971–present)
 Eastview Mall – Victor (1971–present)
 Fashion Outlets of Niagara Falls – Niagara Falls (1982–present)
 Fingerlakes Mall – Aurelius (1980–present)
 Fulton Mall – Brooklyn (1970s–present)
 Galleria at Crystal Run – Wallkill (1992–present)
 Galleria at White Plains – White Plains (1980–2023)
 Gateway Center – Brooklyn (2002–present)
 Great Northern Mall – Clay (1988–2022)
 Green Acres Mall – South Valley Stream (1956–present)
 Hudson Valley Mall – Ulster (1981–present)
 Hylan Plaza – Staten Island (1966–2017)
 Jefferson Valley Mall – Yorktown Heights (1983–present)
 Kings Plaza – Brooklyn (1970–present)
 Kohl's Plaza – Colonie (1990–present)
 Lockport Mall – South Lockport (1971–2006)
 The Mall at Greece Ridge – Greece (1967–present)
 Manhattan Mall – Herald Square, Manhattan (1989–present)
 The Marketplace Mall – Henrietta (1982–present)
 McKinley Mall – Hamburg (1985–present)
 Midtown Plaza – Rochester (1962–2008)
 Mohawk Commons – Niskayuna (2002–present)
 Mohawk Mall – Niskayuna (1970–2000)
 New York Lesso Home – East Garden City (1997–present)
 Newburgh Mall – Newburgh (1980–present)
 Northway Shopping Center – Colonie (1999–present)
 Oakdale Commons – Johnson City (1975–present)
 Palisades Center – West Nyack (1998–present)
 Penn-Can Mall – Cicero (1976–1996)
 Poughkeepsie Galleria – Poughkeepsie (1987–present)
 Queens Center Mall – Queens (1973–present)
 Roosevelt Field – East Garden City (Uniondale) (1956–present)
 St. Lawrence Centre – Massena (1990–present)
 Salmon Run Mall – Watertown (1986–present)
 Sangertown Square – New Hartford (1980–present)
 Saratoga Mall – Wilton (1973–1999)
 ShoppingTown Mall – DeWitt (1954-2020)
 The Shops & Restaurants at Hudson Yards – Manhattan (2019–present)
 The Shops at Columbus Circle – Deutsche Bank Center, Manhattan (2003–present)
 The Shops at Ithaca Mall – Lansing (1976–present)
 The Shops at Nanuet – Nanuet (2013–present)
 Skyview on the Ridge – Irondequoit (1990–2009)
 Smith Haven Mall – Lake Grove (with the western half of the mall in St. James) (1969–present)
 The Source at White Plains – White Plains (2004–present)
 South Shore Mall (New York) – Bay Shore (1963–present)
 Southside Mall – Oneonta (1983–present)
 Staten Island Mall – Staten Island (1973–present)
 The Summit – Wheatfield (1972–2009)
 Sunrise Mall – East Massapequa (1973–2022)
 Via Port Rotterdam – Rotterdam (1988–present)
 Walden Galleria – Cheektowaga (1989–present)
 Walt Whitman Shops – South Huntington (1962–present)
 The Westchester – White Plains (1995–present)
 Westfield World Trade Center – Financial District, Manhattan (2016–present); original name: The Mall at World Trade Center (1975–2001)
 Westgate Plaza – Albany (1957–present)
 Wilton Mall – Wilton (1990–present)
 Woodbury Common Premium Outlets – Central Valley (1985–present)

North Carolina 

 Alamance Crossing – Burlington (2007–present)
 Asheville Mall – Asheville (1973–present)
 Asheville Outlets – Asheville (2015–present)
 Berkeley Mall – Goldsboro (1975–present)
 Burlington Outlet Village – Burlington (1981–present)
 Carolina Mall – Concord (1972–present)
 Carolina Place Mall – Pineville (1991–present)
 Cary Towne Center – Cary (1979–2021)
 Concord Mills – Concord (1999–present)
 Crabtree Valley Mall – Raleigh (1972–present)
 Cross Creek Mall – Fayetteville (1975–present)
 Eastland Mall – Charlotte (1975–June 30, 2010)
 Eastridge Mall – Gastonia (1976–present)
 Four Seasons Town Centre – Greensboro (1974–present)
 Friendly Center – Greensboro (1957–present)
 Golden East Crossing – Rocky Mount (1986–present)
 Greenville Mall – Greenville (1965–present)
 Hanes Mall – Winston-Salem (1975–present)
 Holly Hill Mall and Business Center – Burlington (1969–present)
 Independence Mall – Wilmington (1979–present)
 Jacksonville Mall – Jacksonville (1981–present)
 Marketplace Mall – Winston-Salem (1984–present)
 Mayberry Mall – Mount Airy (1968–present)
 Monroe Crossing – Monroe (1979–present)
 New Bern Mall – New Bern (1979–present)
 North Hills – Raleigh (1960–present)
 Northgate Mall – Durham (1974–2020)
 Northlake Mall – Charlotte (2005–present)
 Oak Hollow Mall – High Point (1995–2017)
 Randolph Mall – Asheboro (1982–present)
 Signal Hill Mall – Statesville (1973–present)
 Southgate Mall – Elizabeth City (1969–present)
 SouthPark Mall – Charlotte (1970–present)
 South Square Mall – Durham (1975–2002)
 The Streets at Southpoint – Durham (2002–present)
 Triangle Town Center – Raleigh (2002–present)
 University Place – Chapel Hill (1973–present)
 Valley Hills Mall – Hickory (1978–present)

North Dakota 

 Columbia Mall – Grand Forks (1978–present)
 Dakota Square Mall – Minot (1980–present)
 Gateway Fashion Mall – Bismarck (1979–present)
 Grand Cities Mall – Grand Forks (1964–present)
 Kirkwood Mall – Bismarck (1970–present)
 West Acres Shopping Center – Fargo (1972–present)

Northern Mariana Islands 
 La Fiesta Mall – Saipan (1993–2004)

Ohio 

 Ashtabula Towne Square – Ashtabula (1992–present)
 Beachwood Place – Beachwood (1978–present)
 Belden Village Mall – Jackson Township, Stark County (1970–present)
 Chapel Hill Mall – Akron (1967–2021)
 Colony Square Mall – Zanesville (1981–present)
 Columbus City Center – Columbus (1989–2009)
 Crocker Park – Westlake (2004–present)
 Dayton Mall – Miami Township, Montgomery County (1970–present)
 Eastgate Mall – Union Township, Clermont County (1980–present)
 Eastland Mall – Columbus (1968–2022)
 Easton Town Center – Columbus (1999–present)
 Eastwood Mall – Niles (1969–present)
 Euclid Square Mall – Euclid (1977–2016)
 Findlay Village Mall – Findlay (1962–present)
 Forest Fair Village – Forest Park (1989–2022)
 Fort Steuben Mall – Steubenville (1974–present)
 Franklin Park Mall – Toledo (1971–present)
 Galleria at Erieview – Cleveland (1987–present)
 Great Lakes Mall – Mentor (1961–present)
 Great Northern Mall – North Olmsted (1976–present)
 The Greene Town Center – Beavercreek (2006–present)
 Indian Mound Mall – Heath (1986–present)
 Kenwood Towne Centre – Cincinnati (1956–present)
 Kingsdale Shopping Center – Upper Arlington (1959–present)
 Legacy Village – Lyndhurst (2003–present)
 Liberty Center – Liberty Township (2015–present)
 Lima Mall – American (1965–present)
 The Mall at Fairfield Commons – Beavercreek (1993–present)
 The Mall at Tuttle Crossing – Columbus (1997–present)
 Miami Valley Centre Mall – Piqua (1988–present)
 Midway Mall – Elyria (1966–present)
 North Towne Square – Toledo (1981–2005)
 Northgate Mall – Northgate (1972–present)
 Northland Mall – Columbus (1964–2002)
 Ohio Valley Mall – Richland Township, Belmont County (1978–present)
 Polaris Fashion Place – Columbus (2001–present)
 Randall Park Mall – North Randall (1976–2009)
 Richland Mall – Ontario (1969–present)
 Richmond Town Square – Richmond Heights (1966–2020)
 River Valley Mall – Lancaster (1987–present)
 Rolling Acres Mall – Akron (1975–2008)
 Sandusky Mall – Perkins (1977–present)
 The Shoppes at Parma – Parma (1956–present)
 The Shops at Fallen Timbers – Maumee (2007–present)
 Southern Park Mall – Boardman (1970–present)
 SouthPark Mall – Strongsville (1996–present)
 Southwyck Mall – Toledo (1972–2008)
 Summit Mall – Fairlawn (1965–present)
 Tower City Center – Cleveland (1990–present)
 Town and Country Shopping Center – Kettering (1951–present)
 Tri-County Mall – Springdale (1960–2022)
 Upper Valley Mall – Springfield (1971–2021)
 Westgate Mall – Fairview Park (1954–present)
 Westland Mall – Columbus (1969–2012)
 Woodville Mall – Northwood (1969–December 2011)

Oklahoma 

 50 Penn Place – Oklahoma City (1973–present)
 Arrowhead Mall – Muskogee (1987–present)
 Central Plaza – Lawton (1979–present)
 Crossroads Mall – Oklahoma City (1974–2017)
 Oakwood Mall – Enid (1984–present)
 OKC Outlets – Oklahoma City (2011–present)
 Penn Square Mall – Oklahoma City (1960–present)
 Quail Springs Mall – Oklahoma City (1980–present)
 Shawnee Mall – Shawnee (1989–present)
 The Shoppes at Northpark – Oklahoma City (1972–present)
 Sooner Mall – Norman (1976–present)
 Tulsa Promenade – Tulsa (1965–present)
 Utica Square – Tulsa (1952–present)
 Washington Park Mall – Bartlesville (1984–present)
 Woodland Hills Mall – Tulsa (1976–present)

Oregon 

 Bridgeport Village – Tigard/Tualatin (2005–present)
 Cascade Station – Portland (2007–present)
 Cedar Hills Crossing – Beaverton (1969–present)
 Clackamas Town Center – Clackamas (1981–present)
 Eastport Plaza – Portland (1960–present)
 Eugene Mall – Eugene (1971–2001)
 Fubonn Shopping Center – Portland (2006–present)
 Heritage Mall – Albany (1988–present)
 Jantzen Beach Center – Portland (1972–present)
 Lloyd Center – Portland (1960–present)
 Mall 205 – Portland (1970–present)
 Oakway Center – Eugene (1966–present)
 Old Mill District – Bend (1992–present)
 Pioneer Place – Portland (1990–present)
 Rogue Valley Mall – Medford (1986–present)
 Salem Center – Salem (1979–present)
 The Shoppes at Gateway – Springfield (1990–present)
 Shute Park Plaza – Hillsboro (1985–present)
 The Streets of Tanasbourne – Hillsboro (2004–present)
 Sunset Esplanade – Hillsboro (1989–present)
 Valley River Center – Eugene (1969–present)
 The Village at Medford Center – Medford (1959–present)
 Washington Square – Tigard (1973–present)
 Willamette Town Center – Salem (1971–present)
 Woodburn Premium Outlets – Woodburn (1999–present)

Pennsylvania 

 Allegheny Center Mall – Pittsburgh (1966–2017)
 Beaver Valley Mall – Monaca (1970–present)
 Berkshire Mall – Wyomissing (1970–present)
 The Block Northway – Pittsburgh (1953–present)
 Capital City Mall – Camp Hill (1974–present)
 Carbon Plaza Mall – Lehighton (1972–present)
 Century III Mall – West Mifflin (1979–2019)
 Chambersburg Mall – Chambersburg (1982–present)
 Colonial Park Mall – Harrisburg (1960–present)
 Columbia Colonnade – Bloomsburg (1988–2022)
 Coventry Mall – Pottstown (1967–present)
 Cressona Mall – Pottsville (1976–present)
 East Hills Shopping Center – Pittsburgh (1960–2001)
 Eastland Mall – North Versailles Township (1963–2005)
 Exton Square Mall – Exton (1973–present)
 Fairgrounds Square Mall – Reading (1980–2018)
 Fairlane Village Mall – Pottsville (1974–present)
 Fashion District Philadelphia – Philadelphia (2019–present)
 Grove City Premium Outlets – Grove City (Unknown–present)
 Harrisburg Mall – Harrisburg (1969–present)
 Highlands Mall – Natrona Heights (1977–2006)
 Indiana Mall – Indiana (1979–present)
 The Johnstown Galleria – Johnstown (1992–present)
 King of Prussia – King of Prussia (1963–present)
 Laurel Mall – Hazleton (1973–present)
 Lebanon Valley Mall – Lebanon (1975–present)
 Lehigh Valley Mall – Fullerton (1976–present)
 Logan Valley Mall – Altoona (1965–present)
 Lycoming Mall – Pennsdale (1978–2023)
 The Mall at Robinson – Robinson Township (2001–present)
 The Marketplace at Steamtown – Scranton (1993–present)
 Millcreek Mall – Millcreek Township, Erie County (1974–present)
 Monroeville Mall – Monroeville (1969–present)
 Montgomery Mall – Montgomeryville (1977–present)
 Neshaminy Mall – Bensalem Township (1968–present)
 Nittany Mall – State College (1968–present)
 North Hanover Mall – Hanover (1967–present)
 North Hills Village – Pittsburgh (1957–present)
 The Outlets at Wind Creek Bethlehem – Bethlehem (2011–present)
 Oxford Valley Mall – Middletown Township (1973–present)
 Palmer Park Mall – Easton (1973–present)
 Park City Center – Lancaster (1971–present)
 Parkway Center Mall – Pittsburgh (1982–2013)
 Philadelphia Mills – Philadelphia (1989–present)
 Philadelphia Premium Outlets – Limerick Township (2007–present)
 Pittsburgh Mills – Tarentum (2005–present)
 Plymouth Meeting Mall – Plymouth Meeting (1966–present)
 The Point at Carlisle Plaza – Carlisle (1964–present)
 Promenade at Granite Run – Media (1974–2015)
 The Promenade Shops at Saucon Valley – Upper Saucon Township (2006–present)
 Roosevelt Mall – Philadelphia (1964–present)
 Ross Park Mall – Pittsburgh (1986–present)
 Schuylkill Mall – Frackville (1980–2018)
 Shenango Valley Mall – Hermitage (1969–present)
 The Shops at Liberty Place – Philadelphia (1990–present)
 South Hills Village – Bethel Park/Upper St. Clair Township (1965–present)
 South Mall – Allentown (1975–present)
 Springfield Mall – Springfield Township (1974–present)
 Strawberry Square – Harrisburg (1978–present)
 Stroud Mall – Stroudsburg (1978–present)
 Suburban Square – Ardmore (1928–present)
 Susquehanna Valley Mall – Selinsgrove (1978–present)
 Uniontown Mall – Uniontown (1972–present)
 Viewmont Mall – Scranton/Dickson City (1968–present)
 Washington Crown Center – Washington (1969–present)
 Washington Mall – Washington (1968–1999)
 Westgate Mall – Bethlehem (1973–present)
 Westmoreland Mall – Greensburg (1977–present)
 Whitehall Mall – Whitehall Township (1966–present)
 Willow Grove Park Mall – Willow Grove (1982–present)
 Wyoming Valley Mall – Wilkes-Barre (1971–present)
 York Galleria – York (1989–present)

Puerto Rico 

Las Catalinas Mall – Caguas (1997–present)
The Mall of San Juan – San Juan (2015–present)
Mayagüez Mall – Mayagüez (1972–present)
Plaza Carolina – Carolina (1978–present)
Plaza del Caribe – Ponce (1992–present)
Plaza del Carmen Mall – Caguas (1970–present)
Plaza del Norte – Hatillo (1992–present)
Plaza del Sol – Bayamón (1998–present)
Plaza Las Américas – San Juan (1968–present)
Plaza Noroeste – Aguadilla (2022; expected opening date)
Plaza Rio Hondo – Bayamón (1982–present)
San Patricio Plaza – Guaynabo (1964–present)
Santa Rosa Mall – Bayamón (1964–present)

Rhode Island 
 Midland Commons – Warwick (1967–2011)
 Providence Place – Providence (1999–present)
 Warwick Mall – Warwick (1970–present)
 Westminster Arcade – Providence (1828–present)

South Carolina 

 Citadel Mall – Charleston (1981–present)
 Coastal Grand Mall – Myrtle Beach (2004–present)
 Columbia Place – Columbia (1977–present)
 Columbiana Centre – Columbia (1990–present)
 Dutch Square – Columbia (1970–present)
 Haywood Mall – Greenville (1980–present)
 Inlet Square Mall – Murrells Inlet (1990–present)
 Magnolia Mall – Florence (1979–present)
 Magnolia Park Town Center – Greenville (2009–present)
 Myrtle Beach Mall – Briarcliffe Acres (1986–present)
 Myrtle Square Mall – Myrtle Beach (1975–2004)
 Northwoods Mall – North Charleston (1972–present)
 Prince of Orange Mall – Orangeburg (1984–present)
 Richland Mall – Columbia (1961–present)
 Rock Hill Galleria – Rock Hill (1991–present)
 Shelter Cove Towne Centre – Hilton Head Island (2017–present)
 The Village at Sandhill – Columbia (2004–present)
 Westgate Mall – Spartanburg (1975–present)

South Dakota 
 Empire Mall – Sioux Falls (1975–present)
 Uptown Rapid – Rapid City (1978–present)

Tennessee 

 100 Oaks Mall – Nashville (1968–present) (redeveloped)
 The Avenue Murfreesboro – Murfreesboro (2007–present)
 Bradley Square Mall – Cleveland (1991–present)
 Carriage Crossing – Collierville (2005–present)
 College Square Mall – Morristown (1988–present)
 Columbia Mall – Columbia (1981–present)
 CoolSprings Galleria – Franklin (1991–present)
 Foothills Mall – Maryville (1983–present)
 Fort Henry Mall (formerly Kingsport Town Center) – Kingsport (1976–present)
 Global Mall at the Crossings (formerly Hickory Hollow Mall) – Antioch (1978–present)
 Governor's Square Mall – Clarksville (1986–present)
 Greeneville Commons – Greeneville (1990–present)
 Hamilton Place – Chattanooga (1987–present)
 Harding Mall – Nashville (1966–2005)
 Hickory Ridge Mall – Memphis (1981–present)
 Indian Lake Village – Hendersonville (2008–present)
 Knoxville Center – Knoxville (1984–2020)
 Main Street Oak Ridge – Oak Ridge (1955–present)
 The Mall at Green Hills – Nashville (1955–present)
 The Mall at Johnson City – Johnson City (1971–present)
 Mall of Memphis – Memphis (1981–2003)
 Northgate Mall – Hixson (1972–present)
 Northgate Mall —Tullahoma (1976–present)
 Oak Court Mall – Memphis (1988–present)
 Old Hickory Mall – Jackson (1967–present)
 One Bellevue Place – Nashville (1990–2008)
 Opry Mills – Nashville (2000–present)
 Peabody Place – Memphis (2001–present) (redeveloped)
 Raleigh Springs Mall – Memphis (1971–2016)
 Rivergate Mall – Nashville (1971–present)
 Shops of Saddle Creek – Germantown (1987–present)
 Southland Mall – Memphis (1966–present)
 Stones River Town Centre – Murfreesboro (1992–present)
 Turkey Creek – Knoxville (Mid-2000s–present)
 West Town Mall – Knoxville (1972–present)
 Wolfchase Galleria – Memphis (1997–present)

Texas 

 Almeda Mall – Genoa, Houston (1968–present)
 Amigoland Mall – Brownsville (1974–1999)
 Barton Creek Square – Austin (1981–present)
 Bassett Place – El Paso (1962–present)
 Baybrook Mall – Clear Lake, Houston (1978–present)
 Brazos Mall – Lake Jackson (1976–present)
 Broadway Square Mall – Tyler (1975–present)
 Central Mall – Port Arthur (1982–present)
 Central Mall – Texarkana (1978–present)
 Cielo Vista Mall – El Paso (1974–present)
 Deerbrook Mall – Humble (1984–present)
 First Colony Mall – Sugar Land (1996–present)
 The Galleria – Uptown, Houston (1970–present)
 Galleria Dallas – Dallas (1982–present)
 Golden Triangle Mall – Denton (1980–present)
 Grapevine Mills – Grapevine (1997–present)
 Greenspoint Mall – Greenspoint, Houston (1976–present)
 Hulen Mall – Fort Worth (1977–present)
 Ingram Park Mall – San Antonio (1979–present)
 Irving Mall – Irving (1971–present)
 Katy Mills – Katy (1999–present)
 Killeen Mall – Killeen (1981–present)
 La Gran Plaza de Fort Worth – Fort Worth (1962–present)
 La Palmera – Corpus Christi (1969–present)
 La Plaza Mall – McAllen (1976–present)
 Lakeline Mall – Austin (1995–present)
 Longview Mall – Longview (1978–present)
 Mall del Norte – Laredo (1977–present)
 Mall of Abilene – Abilene (1979–present)
 Memorial City Mall – Memorial City, Houston (1966–present)
 Midland Park Mall – Midland (1980–present)
 Music City Mall – Lewisville (1989–present)
 Music City Mall – Odessa (1980–present)
 North East Mall – Hurst (1971 or 1972–present)
 North Star Mall – San Antonio (1960–present)
 NorthPark Center – Dallas (1965–present)
 Parkdale Mall – Beaumont (1973–present)
 The Parks Mall at Arlington – Arlington (1988–present)
 Pearland Town Center – Pearland (2008–present)
 PlazAmericas – Sharpstown, Houston (1961–present)
 Post Oak Mall – College Station (1982–present)
 Richland Mall – Waco (1980–present)
 Ridgmar Mall – Fort Worth (1976–present)
 Rio Grande Valley Premium Outlets – Mercedes (2006–present)
 Rolling Oaks Mall – San Antonio (1988–present)
 San Jacinto Mall – Baytown (1981–2020)
 The Shops at La Cantera – San Antonio (2005–present)
 Shops at Rivercenter – Downtown San Antonio (1988–present)
 The Shops at Willow Bend – Plano (2001–present)
 Sikes Senter – Wichita Falls (1974–present)
 South Park Mall – San Antonio (1968–present)
 South Plains Mall – Lubbock (1972–present)
 Southlake Town Square – Southlake (1999–present)
 Southwest Center Mall – Dallas (1975–present)
 Stonebriar Centre – Frisco (2000–present)
 Sunland Park Mall – El Paso (1988–present)
 Sunrise Mall – Brownsville (1979–present)
 Sunrise Mall – Corpus Christi (1981–2019)
 Sunset Mall – San Angelo (1979–present)
 Temple Mall – Temple (1976–present)
 Town East Mall – Mesquite (1971–present)
 Valle Vista Mall – Harlingen (1983–present)
 Valley View Center Mall – Dallas (1973–2019)
 Victoria Mall – Victoria (1981–present)
 West Oaks Mall – Alief, Houston (1984–present)
 Westgate Mall – Amarillo (1982–present)
 Willowbrook Mall – Cypress (1981–present)
 Wonderland of the Americas – Balcones Heights (1961–present)
 The Woodlands Mall – The Woodlands (1994–present)

Utah 

 Cache Valley Mall – Logan (1976–present)
 City Creek Center – Salt Lake City (2012–present)
 Cottonwood Mall – Holladay/Cottonwood Heights (1962-2007, Macy's closed in 2017)
 Fashion Place – Murray (1972–present)
 The Gateway – Salt Lake City (2001–present)
 Jordan Landing – West Jordan (1999–present)
 Layton Hills Mall – Layton (1980–present)
 Newgate Mall – Ogden (1981–present)
 Provo Towne Centre – Provo (1998–present)
 Red Cliffs Mall – St. George (1990–present)
 The Shops at Riverwoods – Provo (1998–present)
 The Shops at South Towne – Sandy (1986–present)
 Station Park – Farmington (2011–present)
 Trolley Square – Salt Lake City (1972–present)
 University Place – Orem (1973–present)
 Valley Fair Mall – West Valley City (1970–present)
 ZCMI Center Mall – Salt Lake City (1975-2007, originally replaced by City Creek)

Vermont 

 Berlin Mall – Berlin (1986–present)
 Church Street Marketplace – Burlington (1981–present)
 CityPlace Burlington – Burlington (1976–2022)
 Diamond Run Mall – Rutland (1995–2019)
 Green Mountain Mall – St. Johnsbury (1974–present)
 University Mall – South Burlington (1979–present)

Virginia 

 Apple Blossom Mall – Winchester (1982–present)
 Ballston Quarter – Arlington (1951–present)
 Bristol Mall – Bristol (1976–2017)
 Central Park – Fredericksburg (1995–present)
 Charlottesville Fashion Square – Charlottesville (1980–present)
 Chesapeake Square – Chesapeake (1989–present)
 Chesterfield Towne Center – Richmond (1975–present)
 Danville Mall – Danville (1984–present)
 Dulles Town Center – Dulles (1999–present)
 Eden Center – Falls Church (1984–present)
 Fair Oaks Mall – Fairfax (1980–present)
 Fashion Centre at Pentagon City – Arlington (1989–present)
 Greenbrier Mall – Chesapeake (1981–present)
 Landmark Mall – Alexandria (1965–2017)
 Lynnhaven Mall – Virginia Beach (1981–present)
 Market Common Clarendon – Arlington (2001–present)
 Military Circle Mall -Norfolk (1970–present)
 MacArthur Center – Norfolk (1999–present)
 Manassas Mall - Manassas (1972–present)
 Norfolk Premium Outlets – Norfolk (2017–present)
 Patrick Henry Mall – Newport News (1987–present)
 Pembroke Mall – Virginia Beach (1966–2022)
 Peninsula Town Center – Hampton (2009–present)
 Potomac Mills – Woodbridge (1985–present)
 Regency Square – Richmond (1975–present)
 River Ridge Mall – Lynchburg (1980–present)
 The Shops at Willow Lawn – Richmond (1956–present)
 Short Pump Town Center – Richmond (2003–present)
 Southpark Mall – Colonial Heights (1989–present)
 Spotsylvania Towne Centre – Spotsylvania County (1980–present)
 Springfield Town Center – Springfield (1973–present)
 Staunton Mall – Staunton (1968–2021)
 Stony Point Fashion Park – Richmond (2003–present)
 Tanglewood Mall – Roanoke (1973–present)
 Tysons Corner Center – McLean (1968–present)
 Tysons Galleria – McLean (1988–present)
 Uptown Christiansburg (formerly New River Valley Mall) – Christiansburg (1988–present)
 Valley Mall – Harrisonburg (1978–present)
 Valley View Mall – Roanoke (1985–present)
 The Village at Shirlington – Arlington (1944–present)
 Virginia Center Commons – Glen Allen (1991–2022)
 Williamsburg Premium Outlets – Williamsburg (1988–present)

Washington 

 Alderwood Mall – Lynnwood (1979–present)
 Bellevue Square – Bellevue (1946–present)
 Bellis Fair Mall – Bellingham (1988–present)
 Capital Mall – Olympia (1977–present)
 Cascade Mall – Burlington (1989–2020)
 Columbia Center Mall – Kennewick (1969–present)
 The Commons at Federal Way – Federal Way (1975–present)
 Everett Mall – Everett (1974–present)
 Kitsap Mall – Silverdale (1985–present)
 Lakewood Towne Center – Lakewood (2002–present)
 Marketplace @ Factoria – Bellevue (1977–present)
 Northgate Mall – Seattle (1950–present)
 NorthTown Mall – Spokane (1955–present)
 The Outlet Collection Seattle – Auburn (1995–present)
 Pacific Place – Seattle (1998–present)
 Redmond Town Center – Redmond (1997–present)
 River Park Square – Spokane (1974–present)
 South Hill Mall – Puyallup (1988–present)
 Spokane Valley Mall – Spokane Valley (1997–present)
 Tacoma Mall – Tacoma (1965–present)
 University Village – Seattle (1956–present)
 Valley Mall - Yakima (1972–present)
 Vancouver Mall – Vancouver (1977–present)
 The Village at Totem Lake – Kirkland (1973–present)
 Wenatchee Valley Mall – Wenatchee (1978–present)
 Westfield Southcenter – Tukwila (1968–present)
 Westlake Center – Seattle (1988–present)

West Virginia 

 Charleston Town Center – Charleston (1983–present)
 Foxcroft Towne Center at Martinsburg – Martinsburg (1992–2016)
 Grand Central Mall – Vienna (1972–present)
 The Highlands – Wheeling (2004–present)
 Huntington Mall – Barboursville (1981–present)
 Meadowbrook Mall – Bridgeport (1982–present)
 Mercer Mall – Bluefield (1980–present)
 Pullman Square – Huntington (2004–present)

Wisconsin 

 The Avenue – Milwaukee (1982–present)
 Bay Park Square – Green Bay (1980–present)
 Bayshore – Glendale (1954–present)
 Beloit Mall – Beloit (1966–2000)
 Brookfield Square – Brookfield (1967–present)
 East Town Mall – Green Bay (1982–present)
 East Towne Mall – Madison (1971–present)
 Forest Mall – Fond du Lac (1973–2020)
 Fox River Mall – Appleton (1984–present)
 Hilldale Shopping Center – Madison (1962–present)
 Mayfair Mall – Wauwatosa (1958–present)
 Memorial Mall – Sheboygan (1969–2017)
 Northland Mall – Appleton (1969–present)
 Northridge Mall – Milwaukee (1972–2003)
 Oakwood Mall – Eau Claire (1986–present)
 Original Outlet Mall – Kenosha (1982–2006) 
 Port Plaza Mall – Green Bay (1977-2006)
 Regency Mall – Racine (1981–present)
 Southridge Mall – Greendale (1970–present)
 Uptown Janesville (formerly Janesville Mall) – Janesville (1973–present)
 Valley Fair Shopping Center – Appleton (1955–present)
 Valley View Mall – La Crosse (1980–present)
 Wausau Center – Wausau (1983–2021)
 West Towne Mall – Madison (1970–present)

Wyoming 
 Eastridge Mall – Casper (1982–present)
 Frontier Mall – Cheyenne (1981–present)
 White Mountain Mall – Rock Springs (1978–present)

See also 
 List of largest shopping malls in the United States
 List of shopping streets and districts by city

 
Dynamic lists
United States